In mathematics, the Fibonacci numbers form a sequence defined recursively by:

That is, after two starting values, each number is the sum of the two preceding numbers.

The Fibonacci sequence has been studied extensively and generalized in many ways, for example, by starting with other numbers than 0 and 1, by adding more than two numbers to generate the next number, or by adding objects other than numbers.

Extension to negative integers
Using , one can extend the Fibonacci numbers to negative integers. So we get:
... −8, 5, −3, 2, −1, 1, 0, 1, 1, 2, 3, 5, 8, ...

See also Negafibonacci coding.

Extension to all real or complex numbers
There are a number of possible generalizations of the Fibonacci numbers which include the real numbers (and sometimes the complex numbers) in their domain.  These each involve the golden ratio , and are based on Binet's formula

The analytic function

has the property that  for even integers . Similarly, the analytic function:

satisfies  for odd integers .

Finally, putting these together, the analytic function

satisfies  for all integers .

Since  for all complex numbers , this function also provides an extension of the Fibonacci sequence to the entire complex plane. Hence we can calculate the generalized Fibonacci function of a complex variable, for example,

Vector space

More generally, the range of  may be taken to be any abelian group (regarded as a Z-module). Then the Fibonacci sequences form a 2-dimensional Z-module in the same way.

Similar integer sequences

Fibonacci integer sequences
The 2-dimensional -module of Fibonacci integer sequences consists of all integer sequences satisfying .  Expressed in terms of two initial values we have: 

where  is the golden ratio.

The sequence can be written in the form

in which  if and only if .  In this form the simplest non-trivial example has , which is the sequence of Lucas numbers:

The properties include:

Every nontrivial Fibonacci integer sequence appears (possibly after a shift by a finite number of positions) as one of the rows of the Wythoff array. The Fibonacci sequence itself is the first row, and a shift of the Lucas sequence is the second row.

See also Fibonacci integer sequences modulo n.

Lucas sequences
A different generalization of the Fibonacci sequence is the Lucas sequences of the kind defined as follows:

Such sequences have applications in number theory and primality proving.

When , this sequence is called -Fibonacci sequence, for example, Pell sequence is also called 2-Fibonacci sequence.

The 3-Fibonacci sequence is
0, 1, 3, 10, 33, 109, 360, 1189, 3927, 12970, 42837, 141481, 467280, 1543321, 5097243, 16835050, 55602393, 183642229, 606529080, ... 

The 4-Fibonacci sequence is
0, 1, 4, 17, 72, 305, 1292, 5473, 23184, 98209, 416020, 1762289, 7465176, 31622993, 133957148, 567451585, 2403763488, ... 

The 5-Fibonacci sequence is
0, 1, 5, 26, 135, 701, 3640, 18901, 98145, 509626, 2646275, 13741001, 71351280, 370497401, 1923838285, 9989688826, ... 

The 6-Fibonacci sequence is
0, 1, 6, 37, 228, 1405, 8658, 53353, 328776, 2026009, 12484830, 76934989, 474094764, 2921503573, 18003116202, ... 

Generally,  can be called -Fibonacci sequence, and  can be called -Lucas sequence.

The (1,2)-Fibonacci sequence is
0, 1, 1, 3, 5, 11, 21, 43, 85, 171, 341, 683, 1365, 2731, 5461, 10923, 21845, 43691, 87381, 174763, 349525, 699051, 1398101, 2796203, 5592405, 11184811, 22369621, 44739243, 89478485, ... 

The (1,3)-Fibonacci sequence is
1, 1, 4, 7, 19, 40, 97, 217, 508, 1159, 2683, 6160, 14209, 32689, 75316, 173383, 399331, 919480, 2117473, 4875913, 11228332, 25856071, 59541067, ... 

The (2,2)-Fibonacci sequence is
0, 1, 2, 6, 16, 44, 120, 328, 896, 2448, 6688, 18272, 49920, 136384, 372608, 1017984, 2781184, 7598336, 20759040, 56714752, ... 

The (3,3)-Fibonacci sequence is
0, 1, 3, 12, 45, 171, 648, 2457, 9315, 35316, 133893, 507627, 1924560, 7296561, 27663363, 104879772, 397629405, 1507527531, 5715470808, ...

Fibonacci numbers of higher order

A Fibonacci sequence of order  is an integer sequence in which each sequence element is the sum of the previous  elements (with the exception of the first  elements in the sequence). The usual Fibonacci numbers are a Fibonacci sequence of order 2. The cases  and  have been thoroughly investigated. The number of compositions of nonnegative integers into parts that are at most  is a Fibonacci sequence of order . The sequence of the number of strings of 0s and 1s of length  that contain at most  consecutive 0s is also a Fibonacci sequence of order .

These sequences, their limiting ratios, and the limit of these limiting ratios, were investigated by Mark Barr in 1913.

Tribonacci numbers 
The tribonacci numbers are like the Fibonacci numbers, but instead of starting with two predetermined terms, the sequence starts with three predetermined terms and each term afterwards is the sum of the preceding three terms. The first few tribonacci numbers are:
0, 0, 1, 1, 2, 4, 7, 13, 24, 44, 81, 149, 274, 504, 927, 1705, 3136, 5768, 10609, 19513, 35890, 66012, … 

The series was first described formally by Agronomof in 1914, but its first unintentional use is in the Origin of Species by Charles R. Darwin. In the example of illustrating the growth of elephant population, he relied on the calculations made by his son, George H. Darwin. The term tribonacci was suggested by Feinberg in 1963.

The tribonacci constant
 
is the ratio toward which adjacent tribonacci numbers tend.  It is a root of the polynomial , and also satisfies the equation .  It is important in the study of the snub cube.

The reciprocal of the tribonacci constant, expressed by the relation , can be written as:
 

The tribonacci numbers are also given by

where  denotes the nearest integer function and

Tetranacci numbers 
The tetranacci numbers start with four predetermined terms, each term afterwards being the sum of the preceding four terms. The first few tetranacci numbers are:
0, 0, 0, 1, 1, 2, 4, 8, 15, 29, 56, 108, 208, 401, 773, 1490, 2872, 5536, 10671, 20569, 39648, 76424, 147312, 283953, 547337, … 

The tetranacci constant is the ratio toward which adjacent tetranacci numbers tend.  It is a root of the polynomial , approximately 1.927561975482925 , and also satisfies the equation .

The tetranacci constant can be expressed in terms of radicals by the following expression:

where, 

Higher orders 
Pentanacci, hexanacci, heptanacci, octanacci and enneanacci numbers have been computed. The pentanacci numbers are:
0, 0, 0, 0, 1, 1, 2, 4, 8, 16, 31, 61, 120, 236, 464, 912, 1793, 3525, 6930, 13624, … 
Hexanacci numbers:
0, 0, 0, 0, 0, 1, 1, 2, 4, 8, 16, 32, 63, 125, 248, 492, 976, 1936, 3840, 7617, 15109, … 
Heptanacci numbers:
0, 0, 0, 0, 0, 0, 1, 1, 2, 4, 8, 16, 32, 64, 127, 253, 504, 1004, 2000, 3984, 7936, 15808, … 
Octanacci numbers:
0, 0, 0, 0, 0, 0, 0, 1, 1, 2, 4, 8, 16, 32, 64, 128, 255, 509, 1016, 2028, 4048, 8080, 16128, ... 
Enneanacci numbers:
0, 0, 0, 0, 0, 0, 0, 0, 1, 1, 2, 4, 8, 16, 32, 64, 128, 256, 511, 1021, 2040, 4076, 8144, 16272, ... 

The limit of the ratio of successive terms of an -nacci series tends to a root of the equation .
 
An alternate recursive formula for the limit of ratio  of two consecutive -nacci numbers can be expressed as
.

The special case  is the traditional Fibonacci series yielding the golden section .

The above formulas for the ratio hold even for -nacci series generated from arbitrary numbers. The limit of this ratio is 2 as  increases.  An "infinacci" sequence, if one could be described, would after an infinite number of zeroes yield the sequence 
[..., 0, 0, 1,] 1, 2, 4, 8, 16, 32, …
which are simply the powers of two.

The limit of the ratio for any  is the positive root  of the characteristic equation
 
The root  is in the interval . The negative root of the characteristic equation is in the interval (−1, 0) when  is even. This root and each complex root of the characteristic equation has modulus .

A series for the positive root  for any  is

There is no solution of the characteristic equation in terms of radicals when .

The th element of the -nacci sequence is given by

A coin-tossing problem is related to the -nacci sequence.

Fibonacci word 

In analogy to its numerical counterpart, the Fibonacci word is defined by:

where  denotes the concatenation of two strings. The sequence of Fibonacci strings starts:

 … 

The length of each Fibonacci string is a Fibonacci number, and similarly there exists a corresponding Fibonacci string for each Fibonacci number.

Fibonacci strings appear as inputs for the worst case in some computer algorithms.

If "a" and "b" represent two different materials or atomic bond lengths, the structure corresponding to a Fibonacci string is a Fibonacci quasicrystal, an aperiodic quasicrystal structure with unusual spectral properties.

Convolved Fibonacci sequences
A convolved Fibonacci sequence is obtained applying a convolution operation to the Fibonacci sequence one or more times. Specifically, define

and

The first few sequences are
: 0, 0, 1, 2, 5, 10, 20, 38, 71, … .
: 0, 0, 0, 1, 3, 9, 22, 51, 111, … .
: 0, 0, 0, 0, 1, 4, 14, 40, 105, … .

The sequences can be calculated using the recurrence

The generating function of the th convolution is 

The sequences are related to the sequence of Fibonacci polynomials by the relation

The first convolution,  can be written in terms of the Fibonacci and Lucas numbers as

and follows the recurrence

The numbers  are the row sums of Hosoya's triangle.

As with Fibonacci numbers, there are several combinatorial interpretations of these sequences. For example  is the number of ways  can be written as an ordered sum involving only 0, 1, and 2 with 0 used exactly once.

Other generalizations
The Fibonacci polynomials are another generalization of Fibonacci numbers.

The Padovan sequence is generated by the recurrence .

The Narayana's cows sequence is generated by the recurrence .

A random Fibonacci sequence can be defined by tossing a coin for each position  of the sequence and taking  if it lands heads and  if it lands tails.  Work by Furstenberg and Kesten guarantees that this sequence almost surely grows exponentially at a constant rate: the constant is independent of the coin tosses and was computed in 1999 by Divakar Viswanath.  It is now known as Viswanath's constant.

A repfigit, or Keith number, is an integer such that, when its digits start a Fibonacci sequence with that number of digits, the original number is eventually reached.  An example is 47, because the Fibonacci sequence starting with 4 and 7  reaches 47.  A repfigit can be a tribonacci sequence if there are 3 digits in the number, a tetranacci number if the number has four digits, etc. The first few repfigits are:
14, 19, 28, 47, 61, 75, 197, 742, 1104, 1537, 2208, 2580, 3684, 4788, 7385, 7647, 7909, … 

Since the set of sequences satisfying the relation  is closed under termwise addition and under termwise multiplication by a constant, it can be viewed as a vector space. Any such sequence is uniquely determined by a choice of two elements, so the vector space is two-dimensional.

for all such sequences .  For example, if  is the Lucas sequence , then we obtain
.

-generated Fibonacci sequence
We can define the -generated Fibonacci sequence (where  is a positive rational number): if

where  is the th prime, then we define

If , then , and if , then .

{|class="wikitable"
!Sequence
!
!OEIS sequence
|-
|Fibonacci sequence
|6
|
|-
|Pell sequence
|12
|
|-
|Jacobsthal sequence
|18
|
|-
|Tribonacci sequence
|30
|
|-
|Tetranacci sequence
|210
|
|-
|Padovan sequence
|15
|
|-
|Narayana's cows sequence
|10
|
|}

Semi-Fibonacci sequence
The bissection  of odd-indexed terms  therefore verifies  and is strictly increasing. It yields the set of the semi-Fibonacci numbers
 1, 2, 3, 5, 6, 9, 11, 16, 17, 23, 26, 35, 37, 48, 53, 69, 70, 87, 93, 116, 119, 145, 154, ... 
which occur as

References

External links
 

Fibonacci numbers